We Farm is a simulation video game developed by Zynga Dallas and published by ngmoco for the iOS platform. It is available for download on the iPhone, iPod Touch and the iPad on the App Store or iTunes. Within weeks of release, We Farm was estimated to have been downloaded millions of times, with approximately two million user sessions per day. Its gameplay is in part inspired by the Zynga game FarmVille.

In November 2010, ngmoco changed the game title  to We Farm Safari.

We Farm requires an Internet connection to play on the iPod Touch.

References

 IGN review
 Slide to Play review
 GameZebo review

2010 video games
IOS games
IOS-only games
Ngmoco games
Simulation video games
Video games developed in the United States
Zynga
Farming video games